Sunken Seas are a four piece Shoegaze rock band from Auckland, New Zealand, formed in late 2011 previously signed to Muzai Records.

Their debut album  Null Hour was released to positive reviews  in June 2012 via Muzai Records in New Zealand and Internationally via Australian label Tenzenmen.

The album was nominated for the 2013 Taite Music Prize.

Following two Australian International tours in 2013 and festival appearances at the Chronophonium Festival  and Camp A Low Hum the band recorded an EP ‘Cataclysm’ with New Zealand recording engineer Nick Roughan of The Skeptics in July 2013 and released the debut single from the EP shortly afterwards  to favourable reviews most notably from Everett True

A short film entitled 'Cataclysm' concerning Existentialism was produced and released by the band on the release of the EP.

Sunken Seas have toured with The Black Angels, Wooden Shjips , Bailterspace & John Cooper Clarke.

In August 2015 the band announced they were to self-release a second album entitled Glass to be released in September 2015, and would be touring New Zealand. The album made the New Zealand Top 20 charts, garnered favorable reviews,
 and was nominated for the 2016 Taite Music Prize.

Discography

Albums

EPs

Music videos

Awards and nominations

References

External links
 Sunken Seas Bandcamp
 Sunken Seas on Muzai Records
 Sunken Seas on Tenzenmen

New Zealand alternative rock groups
Shoegazing musical groups